Mahwal railway station is a railway station on Muzaffarpur–Gorakhpur main line under the Samastipur railway division of East Central Railway zone. This is situated at Mahwal Bakhari in Mehsi of the Indian state of Bihar.

References

Railway stations in Muzaffarpur district
Samastipur railway division